Ng Han Bin (born 13 January 1989) is a Singaporean basketball player who plays for the Singapore Slingers in the Asean Basketball League (ABL).

Career

Singapore Slingers 
On 1 September 2010, Ng was one of the four new rookies, together with Shengyu Lim, Teo Chin Hoe and Chase Tan that signed with the Singapore Slingers in the team's attempt to booster a bigger and taller line-up as compared to previous seasons.

Singapore National Team 
Ng is also a member of the men's Singapore national basketball team. He won the Bronze medals for both 2013 Naypyidaw and 2015 Singapore.

See also 
 FIBA Asia Championship
 Singapore national basketball team
 ASEAN Basketball League
 Singapore Slingers

References

External links 
 
 Hanbin profile at Asia-basket.com

1989 births
Living people
Singaporean men's basketball players
Singapore Slingers players
Point guards
Southeast Asian Games bronze medalists for Singapore
Southeast Asian Games medalists in basketball
Competitors at the 2013 Southeast Asian Games
Competitors at the 2015 Southeast Asian Games
Singaporean sportspeople of Chinese descent
21st-century Singaporean people